There are over 150 species of timber which are produced in India.  Following are the chief varieties of timber (trees) which are used for engineering purposes in India:

¹ After seasoning at 12% moisture content

Indian Mangrove 

Agati
Algaroba
Arni
Ashok
Asian Bushbeech
Badminton Ball Tree
Batino
Blackjack Oak
Bothi
Brazilian Pepper
Buddha Coconut
Cashew
Caucasian Maple
Chaste Tree
Chhal Mogra
Chironji Tree
Cinnamon
Coffee Plum
Common Sesban
Common White Frangipani
Crape Jasmine
Dandal
Devil Tree
East-Indian Screw Tree
Fiddlewood
Frangipani pink
Frangipani red
Fried Egg Tree
Gamhar
Ginkgo
Governor's Plum
Guest Tree
Himalayan Maple
Himalayan Tree Hydrangea
Indian Ash Tree
Indian Bay Leaf
Indrajao
Java Olive
Jerusalem Thorn
Jhand
Kakkar
Kanak Champa
Large Leaf Looking Glass Tree
Lobed-leaf Alangium
Looking Glass Mangrove
Madagascar Palm
Mango
Meda
Mexican Oleander
Moulmein Rosewood
Mountain Sweet Thorn
Nag Kudagr
Nelthare
Netted Custard Apple
Pale Sterculia
Parrot's Beak
Peacock Chaste Tree
Pisa
Pongam Tree
Prickly Padauk
Rain Tree
Sage Leaved Alangium
Scarlet Sterculia
Sea Mango
Singkrang
Spotted Sterculia
Sugar Apple
Sweet Chestnut
Teak
Tipu Tree
Tree Bean
Tree of Life
West Indian Elm
White Frangipani
White Locust Tree
Wild Mango
Wild Tamarind
Woolly Dyeing Rosebay
Woolly Leaved Oak
Ylang Ylang

See also 
Flora of the Indian epic period
Flora of Madhya Pradesh
Indian Council of Forestry Research and Education

References

Lists of trees
Wood
Trees of India
Lists of biota of India